Heteromicta leucospila is a species of snout moth in the genus Heteromicta. It was described by Oswald Bertram Lower in 1907 and is known from Queensland, Australia.

References

Moths described in 1907
Tirathabini